Kalacheyevsky is a rural locality (a settlement) and the administrative center of Kalacheyevskoye Rural Settlement, Kalacheyevsky District, Voronezh Oblast, Russia. The population was 1,082 as of 2010. There are 15 streets.

Geography 
Kalacheyevsky is located 16 km southeast of Kalach (the district's administrative centre) by road. Kolos is the nearest rural locality.

References 

Rural localities in Kalacheyevsky District